Shantz Button Factory is a historic button factory located in southeast Rochester, Monroe County, New York.  The factory consists of three buildings built between 1903 and 1920. The buildings are of heavy timber-frame construction with brick walls, large window openings, flat roofs, and decorative brick cornices. The buildings are five, two, and one stories in height. The button factory closed in the mid-1920s.

It was listed on the National Register of Historic Places in 2013.

References

Buttons
Industrial buildings and structures on the National Register of Historic Places in New York (state)
Industrial buildings completed in 1904
Industrial buildings and structures in Rochester, New York
National Register of Historic Places in Rochester, New York